Patriarch Basil of Bulgaria may refer to:

 Basil I of Bulgaria, Patriarch of Bulgaria c. 1186 – c. 1232
 Basil II of Bulgaria, Patriarch of Bulgaria c. 1246–1263
 Basil III of Bulgaria, Patriarch of Bulgaria c. 1254–1263